The National Energy Conservation Policy Act of 1978 (NECPA) is a United States statute which was enacted as part of the National Energy Act.

The H.R. 5037 legislation was passed by the 95th U.S. Congressional session and enacted into law by the 39th President of the United States Jimmy Carter on November 9, 1978.

Energy demand management programs had been legislated earlier in California and Wisconsin as early as 1975.

Amendments to 1978 Act
Chronological amendments to the National Energy Conservation Policy Act.

See also
Energy management
Energy policy of the United States
Home automation
Solar Photovoltaic Energy Research, Development, and Demonstration Act of 1978

References

External links
  
 
  
 

1978 in law
95th United States Congress
United States federal energy legislation